The 2014–15 Fresno State Bulldogs men's basketball team represented California State University, Fresno during the 2014–15 NCAA Division I men's basketball season. This was head coach Rodney Terry's fourth season at Fresno State. The Bulldogs played their home games at the Save Mart Center and were members of the Mountain West Conference. They finished the season 15–17, 10–8 in Mountain West play to finish in sixth place. They lost in the quarterfinals of the Mountain West tournament to Colorado State.

Previous season
The 2013–14 Fresno State finished the season with an overall record of 21–15, 9–9 in the Mountain West to finish in a tie for fifth place. In the Mountain West Conference tournament, the Bulldogs were defeated by UNLV quarterfinals. They were invited to the College Basketball Invitational which they won game 1 before losing games 2 and 3 to Siena in the championship game.

Departures

Recruiting

Roster

Schedule and results
Source

|-
!colspan=9 style="background:#FF0000; color:#000080;"| Exitbition

|-
!colspan=9 style="background:#FF0000; color:#000080;"| Regular season

|-
!colspan=9 style="background:#FF0000; color:#000080;"| Mountain West tournament

References

Fresno State
Fresno State Bulldogs men's basketball seasons
Fresno
Fresno